Bruno Ricardo Valdez Wilson (born 27 December 1996) is a Portuguese professional footballer who plays for F.C. Vizela as a central defender.

Club career

Braga
Born in Lisbon, Wilson played youth football for Sporting CP in the city. He was an unused substitute for the reserves in the Segunda Liga on 4 May 2014, in a 1–1 home draw against S.L. Benfica B.

On 3 January 2016, Wilson signed a two-year deal at S.C. Braga, being assigned to their second team of the same level. He made his league debut on 13 February, playing the full 90 minutes of a 1–0 loss at C.D. Mafra. He totalled 17 appearances over the season, being sent off in a 2–0 home defeat to S.C. Covilhã on 27 February and scoring in a 3–2 loss at Vitória S.C. B on 17 April.

Wilson was called up to the first team by coach José Peseiro in place of the injured Lazar Rosić for a Primeira Liga game at home to F.C. Paços de Ferreira on 11 December 2016. He played the full 90 minutes of a 3–0 win.

Tondela
On 26 June 2019, Wilson signed a three-year contract with C.D. Tondela, with Braga retaining 50% of the player's rights. He scored his first top-flight goal on 3 November, the only one late on in a home game against former club Sporting.

Return to Braga
Wilson returned to the Estádio Municipal de Braga on 31 January 2020, agreeing to a three-year deal with an option for three additional seasons. He scored his first competitive goal against Vitória F.C. on 23 February, in a 3–1 home victory.

On 30 August 2020, Wilson was loaned for a year to CD Tenerife of Spain's Segunda División. He made 21 total appearances for the team from the Canary Islands, and scored to open a 2–0 home win over Girona FC on 21 December.

Vizela
On 22 June 2021, Wilson joined newly-promoted F.C. Vizela on a three-year contract.

Personal life
Wilson's grandfather, Mário, was also a footballer and later a manager of clubs including S.L. Benfica, and the Portugal national team. Through him, he had American and Mozambican heritage.

References

External links

Portuguese League profile 

1996 births
Living people
Portuguese people of American descent
Portuguese people of Mozambican descent
Portuguese footballers
Footballers from Lisbon
Association football defenders
Primeira Liga players
Liga Portugal 2 players
S.C. Braga B players
S.C. Braga players
C.D. Tondela players
F.C. Vizela players
Segunda División players
CD Tenerife players
Portugal youth international footballers
Portuguese expatriate footballers
Expatriate footballers in Spain
Portuguese expatriate sportspeople in Spain